Ectoedemia eriki is a moth of the family Nepticulidae. It is found in Macedonia and mainland Greece.

The larvae feed on Hypericum olympicum and Hypericum perfoliatum. They mine the leaves of their host plant. The mine consists of a narrow, tortuous corridor, widening into a large blotch with a central concentration of frass.

External links
Fauna Europaea
bladmineerders.nl

Nepticulidae
Moths of Europe
Moths described in 2000